Miguel Ribeiro (born in Sintra, Portugal, 1974) is a Portuguese screenwriter and filmmaker.

Studies

Ribeiro graduated in Political Science from Lisbon's Universidade Lusófona de Humanidades e Tecnologias in 1999. He went on to take film studies at New York Film Academy  in 2002, and in 2003 returned to Portugal to take a documentary filmmaking course at the Videoteca Municipal de Lisboa . In 2005 he completed post-graduate studies at the Faculdade de Direito of the Universidade de Coimbra.

He attended Robert McKee's "Story Seminar" in 2008 and Linda Seger's writing workshop.

He lives and works in Sintra.

Filmography
 Um quadro de rosas, documentário, 2003
 Interrogatório legal, curta-metragem, 2003
 Aquecimento, documentário, 2004
 Making a Man, documentário, 2007
 Poesia de segunda categoria, curta-metragem em produção, 2010

External links
 

Portuguese film directors
1974 births
Living people
New York Film Academy alumni
People from Sintra
Portuguese screenwriters
Male screenwriters